The Liga Española de Baloncesto (English: Spanish Basketball League), whose top division was known as Primera División (English: First Division), was the old 1st Tier level basketball league in Spain, from 1957 to the 1982–83 season. It was organized by the Spanish Basketball Federation, and it was contested by the best clubs of the country. In 1983, the clubs decided to create the Basketball Clubs Association, and transformed the top division into the new Liga ACB, although that league was also named Primera División until 1988.

Format
The league was played in a double round-robin format without playoffs. Two points were conceded for a winning game, one for a draw, and no points for the loser. The worst teams of each season were relegated to the second division (Segunda División, called Primera División B since 1978). The winner of the league qualified for the FIBA European Champions Cup (now called EuroLeague).

History
The league was created in 1957 with the aim of publicising the basketball in Spain. In its first edition composed by six teams, two from Madrid (Real Madrid and Estudiantes) and four from the province of Barcelona (Barcelona, Joventut Badalona, Aismalíbar from Montcada i Reixac and Orillo Verde from Sabadell), and played with a double round-robin format. The league was played in 49 days at only two venues: Frontón Vista Alegre in Madrid and Palacio de Deportes de Montjuic in Barcelona.

Two years later, teams from other regions first entered in the league.

Winners

Source

Titles

Liga Nacional Primera División Top Scorers by season

References

See also
Liga ACB
Asociación de Clubs de Baloncesto
Basketball in Spain
Liga Española de Baloncesto

 
Espanola
Spain
1957 establishments in Spain
1983 disestablishments in Spain